Yadrikha is a rural locality (a village) in Privodinskoye Urban Settlement of Kotlassky District, Arkhangelsk Oblast, Russia. The population was 175 as of 2010. There are 9 streets.

Geography 
Yadrikha is located 15 km southwest of Kotlas (the district's administrative centre) by road. Studenikha is the nearest rural locality.

References 

Rural localities in Kotlassky District